The 2016 World Single Distances Speed Skating Championships was held between 11 and 14 February 2016 in Kolomna, Russia.

Schedule
All times are local (UTC+3).

Medal summary

Medal table

Men's events

Women's events

Participating nations
161 speed skaters (not all skaters at the team pursuit included) from 24 nations participated at the championships. The number of speed skaters per nation that competed is shown in parentheses.

References

External links
 World Single Distances Speed Skating Championships, 11 - 14 Feb 2016, Kolomna, Russia (entries, results and announcements)
 ISU World Single Distances Championships 2016 (results)

 
2016 Single Distances
2016 in speed skating
World Single Distances, 2016
Sport in Kolomna
2016 in Russian sport
World Single Distances Speed Skating Championships